Michael Glassock (born 4 November 1999), is an Australian professional soccer player who plays as a central defender and is currently signed to Sri Pahang who compete in the Malaysia Super League.

Career

Pegasus
Glassock was announced as a Pegasus player on 16 July 2019.
Glassock made his professional debut for Hong Kong Pegasus on the 1st of September, 2019 against Lee Man.

Glassock became a regular first team starter in his first season for the Flying Horseman, playing a total of 20 games across the Hong Kong Premier League, FA Cup, Senior Shield and Sapling Cup Competitions scoring 2 goals.

However, his stay in Hong Kong was cut short due to the 2020 coronavirus pandemic which caused the 2019–20 season to be suspended. On 8 April 2020, Glassock agreed to a mutual termination with Pegasus.

Sydney Olympic FC

On 1 December 2020, Sydney Olympic FC announced they had signed Glassock.

In the 2021 NPL season, Glassock started all of Sydney Olympic’s 17 NPL games and 4 of its FFA Cup Preliminary games before the season ended due to the Covid-19 outbreak in NSW. He scored 4 goals from 21 appearances.

On November 24, at just 22 years and 20 days, Glassock captained Sydney Olympic against Sydney FC in the FFA Cup Round of 32. On the 31st of July, he helped Sydney Olympic to win the 2022 NSW NPL Premiership and was named in NPL NSW Team Of The Year for 2022.

References

External links

1999 births
Living people
Australian soccer players
Association football defenders
Central Coast Mariners FC players
TSW Pegasus FC players
Hong Kong Premier League players
People from the Central Coast (New South Wales)
Sportsmen from New South Wales
Soccer players from New South Wales